

The DINFIA IA 35 Huanquero was a 1950s Argentine twin-engined general-purpose monoplane aircraft built by the DINFIA.

Development

The IA 35 Huanquero was the first aircraft design from the DINFIA organisation (Argentina) to enter production. A twin-engined all-metal (except for fabric-covered ailerons) low-wing cantilever monoplane, it had a high-mounted tailplane with two fins and rudders and retractable tricycle landing gear. It was powered by two I.Ae. 19R El Indio radial engines.

The design team was led by professor Kurt Tank, former Focke-Wulf designer who also designed the Pulqui II jet fighter  based on the Focke-Wulf Ta 183 of the World War II era.

The prototype first flew on 21 September 1953 and was followed by a planned production batch of 100 aircraft. The first production aircraft flew on 29 March 1957 but less than half of the aircraft were built when production ceased in the mid-1960s.

Variants

IA 35 Type 1A
Advanced instrument or navigation trainer, powered by two IA 19R El Indio radial engines.
IA 35 Type 1B
IA 35 Type 1U
Bombing and gunnery trainer, powered by two 750hp (559kW) IA 19SR1 El Indio radial engines.
IA 35 Type II
Light transport version with a crew of three and seven passengers, powered by two IA 19R El Indio radial engines.
IA 35 Type III
Air ambulance version with a crew of three and four stretchers with attendants, powered by two IA 19R El Indio radial engines.
IA 35 Type IV
Photographic reconnaissance version with crew of three and camera operator, powered by two IA 19R El Indio radial engines.
IA 35-X-III Pandora
Civil transport version with room for ten passengers, powered by two 750hp (559kW) IA 19SR1 El Indio radial engines.
IA Constancia II
initial designation of the Guarani I, with Turbomeca Bastan turboprops.
IA 35 Guarani I
IA 50 Guarani II

Survivors

 Huanquero A-316 (ex-Argentine Air Force) is preserved at the Museo Nacional de Aeronautica, Morón, Buenos Aires, Argentina.

Operators

Argentine Air Force

Specifications (IA 35 Type 1A)

See also

Notes

Bibliography
 
 
 
 
 
The Illustrated Encyclopedia of Aircraft (Part Work 1982–1985), 1985, Orbis Publishing

External links 

IA 35 at Flickr
IA 35 at Flickr
IA 35 at Flickr

IA 35
1950s Argentine military utility aircraft
Low-wing aircraft
Twin piston-engined tractor aircraft